Harley Edward "Skeeter" Swift Jr. (June 19, 1946 – April 20, 2017) was an American professional basketball player.

A 6'3" guard from East Tennessee State University, Swift was selected in the third round (31st pick overall) of the 1969 NBA draft by the Milwaukee Bucks, but he instead played five seasons in the American Basketball Association as a member of the New Orleans Buccaneers, Memphis Pros, Pittsburgh Condors, Dallas Chaparrals, and San Antonio Spurs. He averaged 11.6 points per game in his professional career.

Swift died on April 20, 2017, at the age of 70.

References

1946 births
2017 deaths
American men's basketball players
Basketball coaches from Virginia
Basketball players from Virginia
Dallas Chaparrals players
East Tennessee State Buccaneers men's basketball players
High school basketball coaches in the United States
New Orleans Buccaneers players
Memphis Pros players
Milwaukee Bucks draft picks
Pittsburgh Condors players
San Antonio Spurs players
Shooting guards
Sportspeople from Alexandria, Virginia